Anna Blinkova and Alexandra Panova were the defending champions, but both players decided not to participate.

Amandine Hesse and Harmony Tan won the title, defeating Tayisiya and Yana Morderger in the final, 6–4, 6–2.

Seeds

Draw

Draw

References
Main Draw

Internationaux Féminins de la Vienne - Doubles